Adele is a musical in three acts with book, music and lyrics by Adolf Philipp, written also under the pseudonyms "Jean Briquet" and "Paul Hervé". Its music is by Jean Briquet and Adolf Philipp, original French book and lyrics by Paul Hervé, and English adaptation by Adolf Philipp and Edward A. Paulton. The plot concerns a French girl who falls in love with the son of her father's business rival.

Productions 
The Broadway production opened on August 28, 1913, at the Longacre Theatre, transferring to the Harris Theatre and ran for a total of 196 performances. It was directed by Ben Teal and produced by Joseph P. Bickerton Jr. Natalie Alt played the titular role. Georgia Caine was Mme. Myrianne de Neuville, Hal Forde was Baron Charles de Chantilly and Craufurd Kent was Robert Friebur.

The West End London production opened at the Gaiety Theatre on May 30, 1914. Adele was played by Carolyn Thompson and Neuvelle by Georgina Caine.

Song list

Act I 

 It's Love - Adele, Henri Parmaceau, Babiole and Jacques

Is It Worth While? - Adele
Adele - Adele
Like Swallow Flying - Mme. Myrianne de Neuville and Baron Charles de Chantilly
(A) Honeymoon with You - de Neuville and de Chantilly
Paris! Good-Bye! - de Chantilly
Adele - de Chantilly and Girls

Act II 
Wedding Bells - Babiole, Jacques, Bridesmaids and Ushers 
Yours for Me, and Mine for You - Adele, de Chantilly, de Neuville, Robert Friebur, Babiole, Jacques, Bridesmaids and Ushers 
Matter of Opinion - de Neuville, de Chantilly and Friebur 
Close Your Eyes - de Chantilly and Adele 
When the Little Birds Are Sleeping - Friebur and Adele 
The Clock Is Striking Ten - Adele, de Chantilly, de Neuville, Friebur, Babiole, Parmaceau, Alfred Friebur, Jacques, Bridesmaids and Ushers 
Yesterday - Adele

Act III 
You Are a Very Nice Boy - de Neuville, Friebur, Girls and Boys 
Strawberries and Cream - de Chantilly and Adele 
My Long Lost Love, Lenore - Parmaceau 
Gay Soldier Boy - Babiole, Jacques, Girls and Boys 
A Waste of Time to Plan - Adele, de Chantilly, de Neuville and Friebur

External links
Adele at the IBDB database

Broadway musicals
West End musicals
1913 musicals

References